Cyril Stillingfleet Aylmer Simey (18 September 1905 – 19 September 1952) was a British fencer. He competed in the team foil event at the 1928 Summer Olympics.

References

External links
 

1905 births
1952 deaths
British male fencers
Olympic fencers of Great Britain
Fencers at the 1928 Summer Olympics